Malik Taylor (born December 21, 1995) is an American football wide receiver for the New York Jets of the National Football League (NFL). He played college football for Ferris State.

College career
Taylor finished his college career with 121 receptions and 2,091 yards. Taylor received All-GLIAC honors his junior season but suffered a season ending injury his senior year.

Professional career

Tampa Bay Buccaneers
After going undrafted, Taylor signed with the Tampa Bay Buccaneers on May 10. Taylor was waived on May 14, 2019.

Green Bay Packers
On July 19, 2019, Taylor signed with the Green Bay Packers. Taylor was waived on August 31 and signed to the practice squad on September 1.

On September 5, 2020, it was announced Taylor had made the 53-man roster. Taylor made his NFL debut Week 1 against the Minnesota Vikings. Taylor pulled in his first career reception for 20 yards on a 4th down against the Atlanta Falcons in Week 4. Taylor caught his first touchdown in Week 7 against the Houston Texans.

On May 21, 2021, Taylor signed a one-year exclusive-rights free agent tender with the Packers. He was placed on injured reserve on December 24. He signed his tender offer from the Packers on April 18, 2022, to keep him with the team. He was waived/injured on August 17, 2022 and placed on injured reserve. He was released on September 15.

New York Jets
On December 29, 2022, Taylor was signed to the New York Jets practice squad. He signed a reserve/future contract on January 9, 2023.

NFL career statistics

Regular season

References

External links
Green Bay Packers bio
Ferris State Bulldogs bio

1995 births
Living people
Players of American football from Flint, Michigan
American football wide receivers
Ferris State University alumni
Ferris State Bulldogs football players
Tampa Bay Buccaneers players
Green Bay Packers players
New York Jets players